British–Chile relations are foreign relations between the United Kingdom and Chile. The two countries maintain strong cultural ties as Chilean culture was somewhat anglicised after independence, seeing many mutual investments since.  Standard visits, on terms each country applies, allow visitors and short-term study, without need for a travel visa endorsed in a passport.

Neighbouring territories in the South Atlantic and Pacific are notable. The Falkland Islands overseas territory of the UK is near to Chile's Tierra del Fuego Province and Cabo de Hornos commune. The Pitcairn Islands are near to Easter Island.

As more bases have been built across the research-based Antarctic, one of those of the United Kingdom has become the Teniente Luis Carvajal Villaroel Antarctic Base of Chile.

Country comparison

History

England played an important role in Chile's history. According to William Edmundson's A History of the British Presence in Chile, 2009, Chile had the same head of state as England in the 16th century, Queen Mary I. When she married Philip II, he was still a prince, so the King of Spain, Carlos V, Holy Roman Emperor made him and Mary the King and Queen of Chile, as well as of England, Ireland, Naples and Jerusalem. Mary became such from her marriage in 1554 to her husband's coronation as King of Spain in 1556, when Chile became part of the possessions of the Spanish. Although there is no record or evidence to support the claim that Phillip was made 'King of Chile', it still remains as known anecdote in the country.

Throughout the Chilean colonial period, British naval vessels in times of war, occasional privateers – and in times of peace British and colonial pirates, outlaws, at risk of execution by neutral parties – harassed the wealthy Spanish authorities in Chile by plundering their ships. In times of peace private trade ships from both empires brought mutually needed goods. British forces and the Mapuche both allied themselves to depose the Spanish hold in the country. Britain assisted the Chileans' fight for independence in the 1810s, led by Lord Cochrane. The British Admiral Lord Cochrane was the Chilean Navy's first commander who fought in the Chilean War of Independence and five Chilean Navy ships have been named in his honour.

In the early 1910s, Britain sold a super-dreadnought battleship Almirante Latorre to Chile. Although retained by the Royal Navy through the war, the ship was delivered after it and served as the Chilean Navy's flagship for many decades thereafter. In the modern era Chilean Navy and the Royal Navy maintain a close relationship with one ex-British Type 22 and three Type 23 frigates in Chilean service.

During the Falklands War in 1982, with the still pending Beagle conflict, Chile and Colombia became the only Latin American countries to abstain from voting in the TIAR (as did the United States and Trinidad and Tobago). Chile provided the UK with limited, but significant information. The Chilean position is described in detail by  Sir Lawrence Freedman in his book The Official History of the Falklands Campaign.

Resident diplomatic missions

 Chile has an embassy in London.
 United Kingdom has an embassy in Santiago.

See also 
 British Chilean
 Chileans in the United Kingdom

References

Further reading
 Centner, Charles W. "Great Britain and Chilean Mining 1830-1914" Economic History Review 12#1 (1942), pp. 76–82 Online
 Livingstone, Grace. "British campaigns for solidarity with Argentina and Chile." Bulletin of Latin American Research 39.5 (2020): 614-628; late 20c.
 Mayo, John. "Britain and Chile, 1851-1886: anatomy of a relationship." Journal of Interamerican Studies and World Affairs 23.1 (1981): 95-120. Online

External links
 http://ukinchile.fco.gov.uk/en/

 

 
Bilateral relations of the United Kingdom
United Kingdom